East Texas Regional Airport  is an airport located in Gregg County, Texas. Its IATA identifier GGG comes from its prior name, Gregg County Airport. The airport is used for general aviation and military training; it has scheduled flights to Dallas/Fort Worth on American Airlines/American Eagle.

Federal Aviation Administration records say the airport had 24,835 passenger boardings (enplanements) in calendar year 2008, 24,944 in 2009 and 21,830 in 2010. The National Plan of Integrated Airport Systems for 2011–2015 categorized it as a primary commercial service airport (more than 10,000 enplanements per year).

East Texas Regional is home to LeTourneau University's School of Aeronautical Science.  LeTourneau constitutes a very large portion of the airport's traffic and has a fleet of airplanes ranging from Cessna 172s to Citabrias and Piper PA-44 Seminoles.  Most LeTourneau aircraft have tail numbers ending in "LU".  All use the call sign "Jacket" (three letter- JKA).

Each summer the airport hosts the Great Texas Balloon Race, a volunteer-run weekend event held annually since 1980.

History
Construction of the Gregg County Airport and terminal was completed and the airport opened on 15 July 1947. Once open, Mid-Continent and Delta Airlines serviced the airport with commercial flights. Many improvements happened over the years, including runway lights, approach lights, and an instrument landing system. Big changes came in 1970, when the  paved runway 13/31 was completed, and in 1976 when a new air traffic control tower was built. In 2002, the airport was renamed the East Texas Regional Airport. In 2007 the airport was awarded a $6.5 million Airport Improvement Program grant to accomplish major updates to the facility. Included among the projects were the resurfacing of Runway 13/31, as well as the relocation of the ILS glideslope and MALSR due to the creation of an 800' displaced threshold on Runway 13 to comply with FAA runway safety area standards. Former taxiway H (at the intersection of 18/36 and 13/31) was demolished after being identified as a potential hot spot for runway incursions.  The improvements were completed in 2009.

On 8 October 1992, the airport was the first of two stops for Ferry Flight 58 of Space Shuttle Atlantis between the Kennedy Space Center and Palmdale, California, where Atlantis was sent for orbiter maintenance.

Runway 13/31 was a stand-by recovery point for the Space Shuttle Program.

Facilities
It has two asphalt runways:

In the year ending June 30, 2011, the airport had 74,950 aircraft operations, average 205 per day: 91% general aviation, 6% military, 2% air taxi, and 1% airline. 99 aircraft were then based at this airport: 58% single-engine, 23% multi-engine, 18% jet, and 1% helicopter.

Two fixed-base operators (FBOs) are on the field: Stebbins Aviation and KRS Jet Center.

Airline and destination

References

External links

 
 East Texas Regional (GGG) at Texas DOT Airport Directory
 LeTourneau University School of Aeronautical Science
 Great Texas Balloon Race
 Aerial image as of March 1995 from USGS The National Map
 
 
 

Airports in Texas
Transportation in Gregg County, Texas
Buildings and structures in Gregg County, Texas
LeTourneau University